Allothereua lesueurii is a species of centipede in the Scutigeridae family. It is endemic to Australia. It was first described in 1840 by French entomologist Hippolyte Lucas.

Distribution
The species occurs in Queensland and Western Australia.

Behaviour
The centipedes are solitary terrestrial predators that inhabit plant litter and soil.

References

 

 
lesueurii
Centipedes of Australia
Endemic fauna of Australia
Fauna of Queensland
Fauna of Western Australia
Animals described in 1840
Taxa named by Hippolyte Lucas